Kuldip Nayar (14 August 1923 – 23 August 2018) was an Indian journalist, syndicated columnist, human rights activist, author and former High Commissioner of India to the United Kingdom noted for his long career as a left-wing political commentator. He was also nominated as a member of the Upper House of the Indian Parliament in 1997.

Early life and education 
Nayar was born at Sialkot, Punjab, British India on 14 August 1923, in a Punjabi Hindu family. He was educated at Murray College. He completed his B.A. (Hons.) from the Forman Christian College Lahore and LL.B. from the Law College Lahore. In 1952, he studied journalism from the Medill School of Journalism, Northwestern University on a scholarship.

Career 
Nayar was initially an Urdu press reporter. He was editor of the Delhi edition of the English newspaper The Statesman and was arrested towards the end of the Indian Emergency (1975–77). In 1978 he founded the Editors Guild of India.

He was also a human rights activist and a peace activist. He was a member of India's delegation to the United Nations in 1996. He was appointed High Commissioner to Great Britain in 1990 and nominated to the upper house of Indian Parliament, Rajya Sabha in August 1997.

He wrote syndicated columns and op-eds that were published in over 80 newspapers in 14 languages including the Deccan Herald (Bengaluru), The Daily Star, The Sunday Guardian, The News, The Statesman, The Express Tribune, Dawn, and PrabhaSakshi.

Peace activist 
Every year since 2000, Nayar had been leading peace activists to light candles on the Independence days of Pakistan and India (14/15 August) at the Attari-Wagah India-Pakistan border near Amritsar.

He was a close friend of another Pakistani politician ch. Jaleel Ahmed Khan (Ex-MNA) who arranged the launch of Nayar's book (Beyond the lines : An Autobiography) in Avari hotel Lahore in 2013. Both of them participated in various peace enhancing events in both countries as ch. Jaleel Ahmed Khan a senior Pakistani politician who migrated from India in 1947 also strongly advocated peace between the two neighboring countries.

He had been working to free Indian prisoners in Pakistan and Pakistani prisoners in India, who have completed their sentences, but have not been set free.

He had started a tradition of candle vigil since 1995 at Indo-Pak Wagah Border during midnight of 14–15 August for India-Pakistan Peace through celebration of Independence Day and remembering people of both sides. In later years of his life, he could not participate in this due to his old age but inspired many young folks to continue the tradition.  Ten days before his death, he had flagged off 'Aman-Dosti Yatra' which was a 40-member delegation of Aaghaz-e-Dosti that marched from Delhi to Wagah Border under leadership of Aaghaz-e-Dosti founder Ravi Nitesh and Gandhi Global family's secretary Ram Mohan Rai for lighting candles for Indo-Pak Peace and thus continued his legacy. This was his last public presence.

Political commentator 
As a political commentator, Nayar wrote his views freely on most politically current issues. He had supported the movement of Anna Hazare and chided the Pakistan Government for not apologising for the army atrocities in East Pakistan in 1971 that led to the formation of Bangladesh, and for allowing drugs to be smuggled into India.

Nayar has been accused of supporting "anti-Indian conspiracy theories". In a February 2010 article in Pakistani newspaper Dawn, he alleged that the Indian anti-terrorism squad leader Hemant Karkare was murdered by Hindu right-wing activists. In July 2011 US authorities confirmed that Nayar attended many events in United States hosted by and supported by Syed Ghulam Nabi Fai, which had been funded by Pakistan ISI.

Author 
Kuldip Nayar has written widely about current issues and historic persons, including Jawaharlal Nehru and Barry Manilow. Nayar has advocated a policy of bilateral talks and engagement with India's neighbour Pakistan. He is known for his vision of a new South Asia, in which Pakistan and India would be on friendly terms.

Nayar's autobiography is entitled Beyond the Lines. The book was released in July 2012. In 1999, he was awarded an Alumni Merit Award by Northwestern University.

Personal life 
He was married and had two sons, and several grandchildren.

Nayar died in Delhi at 12:30 am on 23 August 2018. His funeral took place on 24 August 2018 at Lodhi Crematorium and was attended by former prime minister Manmohan Singh, current ministers Harsh Vardhan and Rajyavardhan Singh Rathore; current Delhi Chief Minister Arvind Kejriwal and Deputy Chief Minister Manish Sisodia. As per his last wishes, ashes were immersed in Ravi River on the outskirts of Lahore in Pakistan by his family and friends, including Aitzaz Ahsan.

Awards 
 2003- Astor Award for Press Freedom
 2007- Shaheed Niyogi Memorial Award for Lifetime Achievement
 2015- Ramnath Goenka Jeevan Gaurav award.
 2019- Padma Bhushan (Posthumous)

Bibliography 
Nayar is the author of at least 15 books:

References

External links 

Wall at Wagah
Without Fear – The life & trial of Bhagat Singh

1923 births
2018 deaths
20th-century Indian journalists
Indian columnists
People from Sialkot
High Commissioners of India to the United Kingdom
Medill School of Journalism alumni
Forman Christian College alumni
Nominated members of the Rajya Sabha
Indian male journalists
People from Punjab, India
Punjabi people
Recipients of the Padma Bhushan in literature & education